William Alexander Long (28 July 1839 – 30 November 1915) was a race-horse owner and politician in New South Wales, Colonial Treasurer in 1877.

Long was born in Sydney, New South Wales, the son of William Long (1797–1876) and his second wife. Long was educated privately and studied law in England, he was called to the Bar of the Inner Temple on 11 June 1862 and admitted to the New South Wales Bar on 22 December 1862.

Long represented Central Cumberland from 30 June 1875 to 12 October 1877, and Parramatta from 27 October 1877 to 9 November 1880, in the New South Wales Legislative Assembly. He was nominated to the New South Wales Legislative Council on 8 September 1885, a position he held until 17 March 1900. He was Colonial Treasurer in the Robertson Government from 17 August to 17 December 1877.

Long was also a race-horse owner and one of his horses, Grand Flaneur, won nine successive races, including the Australian Jockey Club Derby, the Victoria Derby and the Melbourne Cup.

Long died unmarried on 30 November 1915 at Lewisham Hospital, Sydney.

References

 

1839 births
1915 deaths
Treasurers of New South Wales
Members of the New South Wales Legislative Assembly
Members of the New South Wales Legislative Council
Politicians from Sydney
Australian racehorse owners and breeders
19th-century Australian businesspeople